What Price Vengeance? is a 1937 Canadian film directed by Del Lord.

The film is also known as Vengeance.

Premise 
A policeman (Lyle Talbot) hesitates to use his gun to stop a robbery, and the thieves get away. He is forced to quit the force and turns to a life of crime instead.

Cast 
Lyle Talbot as Tom Connors - posing as "Dynamite" Hogan
Wendy Barrie as Polly Moore
Marc Lawrence as Pete Brower
Eddie Acuff as Tex McGirk
Lucille Lund as "Babe" Foster
Robert Rideout as Slim Ryan
Reginald Hincks as Police Inspector Blair
Wally Albright as "Sandy" MacNair
Lois Albright as Mary MacNair
Arthur Kerr as Officer Bill MacNair

Soundtrack

External links 

1937 films
1930s action thriller films
1930s crime thriller films
Canadian action thriller films
English-language Canadian films
Canadian crime thriller films
1930s English-language films
Canadian black-and-white films
Films directed by Del Lord
1930s Canadian films